This is a list of films produced by the Sandalwood (Kannada language film industry) based in Bangalore in 2008.

List of Kannada films released

References

External links
 Kannada Movies of 2008 at the Internet Movie Database

See also
Kannada films of 2005
Kannada films of 2006
Kannada films of 2007
Kannada films of 2009
Kannada films of 2010
Cinema of Karnataka

2008
Kannada
2008 in Indian cinema